A ravine is a landform that is narrower than a canyon and is often the product of streambank erosion. Ravines are typically classified as larger in scale than gullies, although smaller than valleys. Ravines may also be called a cleuch, dell, ghout (Nevis), gill or ghyll, glen, gorge, kloof (South Africa), and chine (Isle of Wight)

A ravine is generally a fluvial slope landform of relatively steep (cross-sectional) sides, on the order of twenty to seventy percent in gradient. Ravines may or may not have active streams flowing along the downslope channel which originally formed them; moreover, often they are characterized by intermittent streams, since their geographic scale may not be sufficiently large to support a perennial watercourse.

Notable ravines

 Babi Yar, Ukraine
 Bam Bam Amphitheaters, 
 Barranco de Badajoz, Spain
 Barranco del Infierno, Spain
 Gravina Ravine, Italy
 Moola Chotok, Pakistan
 Ravenna Park, United States
 Rauðfeldsgjá, Iceland
 Stuðlagil, Iceland
 Taishaku Valley, Japan
 Toronto ravine system, Canada

References

External links

Erosion landforms
Fluvial landforms
Slope landforms
 
Oronyms